Bemotrizinol (INN/USAN, INCI bis-ethylhexyloxyphenol methoxyphenyl triazine) is an oil-soluble organic compound that is added to sunscreens to absorb UV rays. It is marketed as Parsol Shield, Tinosorb S, and Escalol S.

Bemotrizinol is a broad-spectrum UV absorber, absorbing UVB as well as UVA rays. It has two absorption peaks, 310 and 340 nm. It is highly photostable. Even after 50 MEDs (minimal erythemal doses), 98.4% remains intact. It helps prevent the  photodegradation of other sunscreen actives like avobenzone.  A recent development is Tinosorb S Aqua, which is bemotrizinol in a PMMA matrix dispersed in water. This makes it possible to add bemotrizinol to the water phase.

Bemotrizinol has strong synergistic effects on the SPF when formulated with bisoctrizole, ethylhexyl triazone or iscotrizinol. It is the most effective UV absorber available measured by SPF, based on the maximum concentration permitted by European legislation.

As of 2022, bemotrizinol is not approved by the United States Food and Drug Administration for use in sunscreens, but has been approved in the European Union since 2000 and some other parts of the world, including Australia.

Unlike some other organic sunscreen actives, it shows no estrogenic effects in vitro.

References

Sunscreening agents
Triazines
Phenols
Phenol ethers